"We Make It Bounce" is a song by American electronic music producer Dillon Francis and American EDM trio Major Lazer, featuring guest vocals from English-Jamaican reggae singer Stylo G. The song was written by Dillon Francis and Stylo G, with production handled by Dillon Francis and Major Lazer. The song was released as a digital download by Mad Decent and Columbia Records on 16 September 2014, and is the fourth single of Dillon Francis debut album Money Sucks, Friends Rule. The song is written by Dillon Francis and Stylo G, with production handled by Dillon Francis and Major Lazer.

Background
Dillon Francis announced that he was working with electronic music trio Major Lazer and reggae singer Stylo G, for Dillon Francis debut album's fourth single "We Make It Bounce". Francis already released the song on 16 September 2014, on digital stores and streaming services like Spotify, Deezer, iTunes, Google Play and Amazon . The song also marks the second collaboration between American DJs Dillon Francis and Diplo.

On 15 March 2011, Francis released an EP named "Westside EP", and it consists of five tracks. For the third track of the EP, Dillon Francis worked with DJ Diplo and American singer Maluca to the release of the song, and it’s  named "Que Que". That marks the first time that Dillon Francis worked with Diplo.

When Diplo announced that the Major Lazer trio will collaborate with Francis to a new song, he also announced that he is working for a Major Lazer third studio album Peace is the Mission. He said that he has been working with a lot of people the last couple of years, and he was pulling all the favors for that record for sure.

Chart performance

Weekly charts

Release history

References

2014 songs
Electronic songs